Muricopsis rutila, common name : the beaded drupe,  is a species of sea snail, a marine gastropod mollusk in the family Muricidae, the murex snails or rock snails.

Subspecies
There are two subspecies:
 Muricopsis rutila mariangelae Rolan & Fernandes, 1991 : this subspecies is endemic to São Tomé and Príncipe
 Muricopsis rutila rutila (Reeve, 1846): this species is found in the Atlantic Ocean off Ghana: represented as Muricopsis rutila (Reeve, 1846)

Description
The size of an adult shell varies between 10 mm and 20 mm.

References

 Rolàn, E. & Fernandes, F., 1991. Muricopsis (Risomurex) (Gastropoda, Muricidae) de les islas de Sao Tomé y Principe (Golfo de Guinea, Africa occidental). Apex 6(1): 11-20

External links
 Reeve, L. A. (1846). Monograph of the genus Ricinula. In: Conchologia Iconica, or, illustrations of the shells of molluscous animals, vol. 3, pl. 1-6 and unpaginated text. L. Reeve & Co., London

Muricidae
Molluscs of the Atlantic Ocean
Invertebrates of West Africa
Invertebrates of São Tomé and Príncipe
Gastropods described in 1846
Taxobox binomials not recognized by IUCN